41 Aquarii is a double star in the equatorial constellation of Aquarius. 41 Aquarii is its Flamsteed designation. It is visible to the naked eye as a dim, orange-hued point of light with a combined apparent visual magnitude of 5.354.

The brighter component of the pair is a red clump giant star with a stellar classification of K0 III and a magnitude of 5.73. This is an aging star that has exhausted the supply of hydrogen at its core and is now generating energy through core helium fusion. It has eight times the girth of the Sun and is radiating 34 times the luminosity of the Sun at an effective temperature of 4,750 K.

At an angular separation of  5.148 arcseconds, the fainter companion is an F-type main sequence star with a magnitude 7.16 and a classification of F8 V. It has 1.8 times the Sun's radius and is radiating six times the Sun's luminosity from its photosphere at 6,899 K.

References

K-type giants
F-type main-sequence stars
Horizontal-branch stars
Double stars

Aquarius (constellation)
BD-21 6180
Aquarii, 041
210960
109786
8480